Un mouton à l'entresol is a one-act comedy by Eugène Labiche, in collaboration with Albéric Second, premiered at the théâtre du Palais-Royal in Paris on 30 April 1875.

Cast of the premiere 

French plays
1875 plays